D22 is a state road in the central Croatia connecting Novi Marof via Križevci, to the Sveti Ivan Žabno.

The road, as well as all other state roads in Croatia, is managed and maintained by Hrvatske ceste, state owned company.

Traffic volume 

Traffic is regularly counted and reported by Hrvatske ceste, operator of the road.

Road junctions and populated areas

Maps

Sources

D022
D022
D022